Earlan Bartley (born December 19, 1993), better known as Alkaline, is a Jamaican Dancehall and Reggae musician from Kingston, Jamaica.

Early life
Earlan was born in Kingston's Victoria Jubilee Hospital. He attended Ardenne High School and studied Media and Communication at the University of the West Indies. During his time in high school is when he started to have the determination for music. With the support of his close friends he visited local recording studios after school whenever he had the chance.

Career

2011–2014: Early career
Bartley began recording at the age of 16 and using the stage name Alkaline. When he was still in school, he made songs like "Proof", "Mi Love Woman", "Reflections" and "Missing You" creating long-term predictions and expressing his teenage experiences while making music videos on school grounds and in the streets of Jamaica with his close friends.

He eventually began working with Notnice Records and UIM Records and became popular in Jamaica with a series of singles like "123", "High Suh", "Bruk Out", "Things Mi Love" and "Live Life" but the single he was very well known for was "Move Mountains", He went on to feature those singles on multiple EPs and Mixtapes.

2015–2016: Breakthrough with New level Unlocked 
In mid 2015 Alkaline pushed himself to the international market with his hit singles "On Fleek (Love Yuh Everything)" and "Ride on Me (Remix)" featuring Sean Kingston while consistently working on his debut album New Level Unlocked.

He released two other hit singles that year which was "ATM" on September 30, 2015, and "Champion Boy" on October 30, 2015, which were both featured on the New Level Unlocked Album. The album was released on March 25, 2016, under DJ Frass Records, going on to top the Billboard Reggae Charts in April which stood for 18 weeks, making him the first dancehall deejay to have a number one album on the charts in five years. New Level Unlocked was selected at number 3 in Billboard'''s "10 Best Reggae Albums of 2016". He also had multiple hit singles that year with "Formula", "My Side of The Story", "Block and Delete", "After All", "12 PM (Living Good), "Spoil You", "Extra Lesson" and "Badness It Name" . In September 2016 he was nominated for a MOBO Award for the second time in the Best Reggae Act category. His "Champion Boy" single was used in an advertising campaign for the Red Stripe Premier League. With the crew name Vendetta which he uses to categorize his fans, made the launch of a clothing line considered as Detta Gear. He was also featured on a remix of Shaggy's "That Love" on November 11, 2016.2017–2018: New Rules
Alkaline was considered one of the young hot acts in the Dancehall space, not only because of his extreme talent but his huge controversial relevancy. For a certain period of time, he was very distant from Jamaica focusing more on the international scene. Over time there were critics claiming that he switched up on Jamaica given the fact that he didn't perform for a long time in his home country.

After his album tour, on March 25, 2017 Alkaline decided to prove the critics wrong by creating his own show called New Rules Festival which he brought to his home country and quickly began to be one of the most anticipated show of the year with artist like Mavado, Shaggy, I-Octane, Tarrus Riley, Jahmiel and many more at Jamaica's national stadium car park. With one of the biggest turnouts on a Jamaican stage show, Many attendees of the show would come out to say "New Rules" is one of Dancehalls greatest shows ever and will definitely go down in history.

In the following months of that year in July Alkaline attended Jamaica's Biggest annual stage show, Reggae Sumfest in which he hadn't performed at since 2014 making a huge come back as one of the main performers as he featured the legendary Dean Fraser. On September 8, 2018 Alkaline brought his second New Rules show to Queens, New York in Amazura.

 2019–present: iFruit Radio, Top Prize, Givenchy and New Rules Festival's  
In early December Alkaline's 2019 single "With the Thing" was featured on the Video game Grand Theft Auto V with the "iFruit Radio" soundtrack.On February 12, 2021, Alkaline announced his second studio album Top Prize. With the announcement of his sophomore album, he made an appearance on Audiomack making him the first Jamaican Dancehall artist to be featured on the Fine Tuned series. The album was published on May 14, 2021 with the lead single "Ocean Wave" which was publish on March 6, 2020. After the first week the album peaked at No. 2 on the Billboard’s Reggae Albums Charts, No. 19 on the Heat Seekers Albums Charts for sale ranks and No. 56 on Top Current Album Sales which gained him a spot at No. 37 on Billboard's Emerging Artists that seeks to highlight the top performing and rising acts.

On March 27, 2022 Alkaline headlined his third New Rules Festival at the Miramar Regional Amphitheater in Miami, Florida with featuring acts like Mavado, Kranium and Wayne Wonder.

On June 22, 2022 Alkaline had his music featured on Givenchy's Men’s Spring Summer 2023 RTW Show in Paris, France which was directed by fashion designer Matthew M. Williams. In the same year on July 2, 2022 Alkaline returned his New Rules Festival to Kingston, Jamaica at the national stadium car park. On behalf of his New Rules organization one million Jamaican dollars was donated to the Jamaica Society for the blind.

On January 9, 2023 Alkaline was partnered on Givenchy's spring-summer 2023 men’s global advertising campaign wearing the latest collection with photography from Matthew M. Williams. It was announced that Alkaline will serve as the face of the SS23 campaign.

Controversies
Corneal Tattoo
When Alkaline first appeared on the Jamaican Dancehall scene in 2013, he became known for his distinctive look, with the bleached skin and blond dreadlocks but the most controversial was his alleged tattooed eyes, which prompted others to follow suit. He caused quite the stir as he claimed to have Corneal tattooing in his eyeballs. Lauded as a publicity stunt by the Jamaican public, Alkaline received much backlash for the controversial move but also gained a heavy music following. An ongoing theme in much of his breakout music was the year "2016", which generated much intrigue as he never explicitly stated the year's meaning or significance. He would keep up the charade for about 3 years, until he finally revealed the "tattoos" to be nothing more than a stunt. As the Jamaican public ushered in the year of 2016. He soon revealed that the significance of 2016 lay in the fact that he was giving himself until that year to have his music speak for itself, and no longer require publicity stunts for any form of media coverage. This prompted the release of his debut album, New Level Unlocked. He has since halted wearing the black contact lenses that would cover his cornea.

Discography
Albums
 New Level Unlocked (2016)Top Prize (2021)

 Mixtapes 

 Alkaline Mixtape (2014)
 Raw as Eva (2014)

 EPs 

 123 EP (2014)
 Gone Away - EP (2014)
 F*ck You (2014)
 Ride or Die (2015)
 The Ripple EFFX - EP'' (2022)

As featured artist

References

1993 births
Living people
Jamaican dancehall musicians
Musicians from Kingston, Jamaica